Bloody Hell (film) may refer to:
 Bloody Hell (2020 film)
 Bloody Hell (2023 film)